Sunfield is a village in Eaton County in the U.S. state of Michigan.  The population was 578 at the 2010 census.  The village is located within Sunfield Township.

Geography

Demographics

2010 census
As of the census of 2010, there were 578 people, 215 households, and 148 families living in the village. The racial makeup of the village was 96.7% White, 0.2% Asian, 1.4% from other races, and 1.7% from two or more races. Hispanic or Latino of any race were 3.6% of the population.

There were 215 households, of which 43.7% had children under the age of 18 living with them, 43.3% were married couples living together, 17.2% had a female householder with no husband present, 8.4% had a male householder with no wife present, and 31.2% were non-families. 26.0% of all households were made up of individuals, and 9.3% had someone living alone who was 65 years of age or older. The average household size was 2.65 and the average family size was 3.14.

The median age in the village was 32.4 years. 31.3% of residents were under the age of 18; 8.4% were between the ages of 18 and 24; 28.1% were from 25 to 44; 22.1% were from 45 to 64; and 10.2% were 65 years of age or older. The gender makeup of the village was 43.9% male and 56.1% female.

2000 census
As of the census of 2000, there were 591 people, 222 households, and 156 families living in the village. The racial makeup of the village was 96.95% White, 0.51% African American, 0.17% Native American, 0.68% from other races, and 1.69% from two or more races. Hispanic or Latino of any race were 1.86% of the population.

There were 222 households, out of which 36.5% had children under the age of 18 living with them, 49.1% were married couples living together, 14.0% had a female householder with no husband present, and 29.7% were non-families. 23.9% of all households were made up of individuals, and 9.5% had someone living alone who was 65 years of age or older.  The average household size was 2.66 and the average family size was 3.16.

In the village, the population was spread out, with 30.3% under the age of 18, 8.3% from 18 to 24, 28.4% from 25 to 44, 22.2% from 45 to 64, and 10.8% who were 65 years of age or older.  The median age was 32 years. For every 100 females, there were 85.3 males.  For every 100 females age 18 and over, there were 89.9 males.

The median income for a household in the village was $41,607, and the median income for a family was $50,729. Males had a median income of $38,750 versus $23,889 for females. The per capita income for the village was $18,779.  About 1.9% of families and 4.0% of the population were below the poverty line, including 4.8% of those under age 18 and 7.5% of those age 65 or over.

References

Villages in Eaton County, Michigan
Villages in Michigan
Lansing–East Lansing metropolitan area